Tuscawilla, also known as Knight Farm and Edward Dana Knight Farm, is a historic home located near Lewisburg, Greenbrier County, West Virginia. It was built in 1844, and is an "L"-shaped brick house with a 5-bay front facing west. The facade has both Federal and Neo-Classical design elements. It features a one-story portico with modified Doric order columns centered at the front elevation.  Several additions were made to the house after 1920.

It was built by John W. Dunn, "a noted contractor-architect" of the Greenbrier Valley region, and "is viewed as among the most significant houses" of the region.

It was listed on the National Register of Historic Places in 1979.

References

Houses on the National Register of Historic Places in West Virginia
Federal architecture in West Virginia
Neoclassical architecture in West Virginia
Houses completed in 1844
Houses in Greenbrier County, West Virginia
National Register of Historic Places in Greenbrier County, West Virginia
Farms on the National Register of Historic Places in West Virginia
John W. Dunn buildings